Mandeville Aerodrome  is an airport at Mandeville, New Zealand. It is the home of the Croydon Aircraft Company, which restores vintage aircraft and provides training, scenic, and aerial experience flights in vintage aircraft.

References
NZAIP Volume 4 AD
New Zealand AIP (PDF)

Airports in New Zealand
Buildings and structures in Southland, New Zealand
Transport in Southland, New Zealand
Transport buildings and structures in Southland, New Zealand